Sal Abruscato (born July 18, 1970) is an American drummer, guitarist and singer, best known as the original drummer for Brooklyn metal bands Type O Negative and Life of Agony.

He is currently the frontman for doom metal band A Pale Horse Named Death, with whom he has released four albums: And Hell Will Follow Me (2011), Lay My Soul to Waste (2013), When the World Becomes Undone (2019) and Infernum in Terra (2021).

Discography

Type O Negative
Slow Deep and Hard (1991)
The Origin of the Feces (1992)
Bloody Kisses (1993)
After Dark DVD (1994)
Life Is Killing Me (2003) (Guest backing vocals on "I Like Goils")

Life of Agony
River Runs Red (1993)
Ugly (1995)
River Runs Again (2003)
Broken Valley (2005)
A Place Where There's No More Pain (2017)

A Pale Horse Named Death
And Hell Will Follow Me (2011)
Lay My Soul to Waste (2013)
When the World Becomes Undone (2019)
Infernum in Terra (2021)

References

External links
 A Pale Horse Named Death official website

1970 births
Living people
Musicians from Brooklyn
American heavy metal drummers
Type O Negative members
20th-century American drummers
American male drummers
21st-century American drummers
20th-century American male musicians
21st-century American male musicians
American people of Italian descent